The 1998 Anzac test was a rugby league test match played between Australia and New Zealand at the North Harbour Stadium 24 April 1998. It was the 2nd Anzac test played between the two nations since the first was played under the Super League banner in 1997 and the first to be played in New Zealand.

Australia led 12-6 at half time after two tries to Terry Hill while Kevin Iro crossed for the home side, but the Kiwis came back thanks to two tries after half time by Sean Hoppe and Terry Hermansson which saw NZ lead 18-12. After Steve Renouf scored with only his 3rd touch of the game midway through the second half, the game was in the balance with the score at 18-16. Kevin Iro then put the result beyond doubt with his second try with 2 minutes remaining to give the home side a 22-16 win in front of an almost full house of 24,620 fans. This was New Zealand's first win over Australia since the first test of the 1991 Trans-Tasman Test series at the Olympic Park Stadium in Melbourne.

Squads
Although Rodney Howe, Brad Thorn and Darren Lockyer had played Super League Tests for Australia in 1997, according to official Australian Rugby League records (but not International Rugby League records) which do not recognise any test match played under the Super League banner, they along with Mat Rogers made their test debuts for Australia in this game.

Match summary

References

Anzac Test
International rugby league competitions hosted by New Zealand
Rugby league in Auckland
Anzac Test
Anzac Test